Oļegs Maļuhins (рус. Олег Малюхин, born 6 May 1969) is a former Latvian biathlete.

Maļuhins was node made part of the Latvian Olympic biathlon team in 2006, and so participated in cross-country skiing instead. He retired after that season, but announced a comeback in 2008 stating that he would try to qualify for the 2010 Winter Olympics. He did not qualify. Altogether, he participated in five Olympic Games.

Currently, he works as a coach near Daugavpils.

Biathlon results
All results are sourced from the International Biathlon Union.

Olympic Games

*Pursuit was added as an event in 2002.

World Championships

*During Olympic seasons competitions are only held for those events not included in the Olympic program.
**Team was removed as an event in 1998, and pursuit was added in 1997 with mass start being added in 1999.

Individual victories
1 victory (1 Sp)

*Results are from UIPMB and IBU races which include the Biathlon World Cup, Biathlon World Championships and the Winter Olympic Games.

References

External links
 
 
 

1969 births
Living people
Sportspeople from Daugavpils
Latvian male biathletes
Latvian male cross-country skiers
Biathletes at the 1992 Winter Olympics
Biathletes at the 1994 Winter Olympics
Biathletes at the 1998 Winter Olympics
Biathletes at the 2002 Winter Olympics
Olympic biathletes of Latvia
Cross-country skiers at the 2006 Winter Olympics
Olympic cross-country skiers of Latvia